The 2022 season is Tampines Rovers's 27th season at the top level of Singapore football and 77th year in existence as a football club. The club will also compete in the Singapore League Cup, the Singapore Cup, and the AFC Cup.

Squad

Singapore Premier League

U21

U17

Women (JSSL Tampines)  

Signed for 2023 Season

Coaching staff

Transfers

In 

Pre-season

Mid-season

Loan Return 

Pre-season

Note 1:

Out
Pre-season

Loan Out

Mid-season

Extension and retained

Note 1: Shah Shahiran currently with Young Lions due to his NS commitments.

Friendlies

Pre-season

In-season

Team statistics

Appearances and goals
 19 Nov 2022

Competitions

Overview

Results summary (SPL)

Singapore Premier League

AFC Cup

Group stage

Singapore Cup

Group

Semi-final

Tampines Rovers won 9-1 on aggregate.

Final

Competition (U21)

Stage 1

 League table

Stage 2

 League table

Competition (U17)

U17 League

League table

Competition (Women)
Women's National League

Group
(Played under name of JSSL FC) 

League table

Semi-final

Final

See also 
 2012 Tampines Rovers FC season
 2013 Tampines Rovers FC season
 2014 Tampines Rovers FC season
 2015 Tampines Rovers FC season
 2016 Tampines Rovers FC season
 2017 Tampines Rovers FC season
 2018 Tampines Rovers FC season
 2019 Tampines Rovers FC season
 2020 Tampines Rovers FC season
 2021 Tampines Rovers FC season

Notes

References 

Tampines Rovers FC
Tampines Rovers FC seasons
2022 in Asian association football leagues
2022
1